Two leadership elections were held in the Liberal Party of Newfoundland and Labrador in 2011:

Liberal Party of Newfoundland and Labrador leadership election, May 2011
Liberal Party of Newfoundland and Labrador leadership election, August 2011